Georges Boulogne (1 July 1917 – 24 August 1999) was a French football player and manager, better known for his stint as France national team manager.

Career
born in Haillicourt, Boulogne played amateur football for AC Amboise and CO Saint-Dizier, where he started his coaching career.

He then left France for Belgium, where he coached Racing Club de Gand and R.C.S. Verviétois. He came back to France and managed CA Vitry and Mulhouse.

He entered the FFF in 1958 as instructeur national (coaching professor) and became the national team's coach in 1969.

He gave his name to the city stadium of Amboise.

References

External links
 Profile at FFF

1917 births
1999 deaths
French footballers
CO Saint-Dizier players
French football managers
FC Mulhouse managers
France national football team managers
R.C.S. Verviétois managers
K.R.C. Gent managers
Association footballers not categorized by position